Della Reese At Basin Street East is a live album by Della Reese that was recorded and released in 1964.

The album was conducted by John Cotter, and it was issued on compact disc alongside the 1962 album Della on Stage, in 2004 by BMG.

Track listing

Side one
"Put on a Happy Face/ I Want to Be Happy" (2:14)
"The Best Thing for You" (2:42)
"I Wanna Be Around" (1:57)
"Don't Tell Me Your Troubles" (1:55)
"I'll Take Care of Your Cares" (4:20)
"Nobody's Sweetheart" (4:21)

Side two
"'S Wonderful" (1:37)
"Anything Goes" (2:08)
"Don't Take Your Love from Me" (4:22)
"Chicago" (2:52)
"And Now" (2:15)
"You Came a Long Way from St. Louis" (3:14)

References

 "Della Reese on Stage/At Basin Street East" at AllMusic.

1964 live albums
RCA Victor live albums
Della Reese albums
Albums produced by Hugo & Luigi
Albums recorded at Basin Street East